Latimer and Ley Hill, formerly just Latimer, is a civil parish under Buckinghamshire Council, in the ceremonial county of Buckinghamshire, England. The parish includes Latimer, Ley Hill and Tyler's Hill. As of 2020, it has a population of 986. Until 2020 it was in the Chiltern district.

History 
The parish was renamed from "Latimer" to "Latimer and Ley Hill" on 9 April 2013. The parish council was also renamed from "Latimer Parish Council" to "Latimer and Ley Hill Parish Council" at the same time. It was felt that the name better reflected the area since Ley Hill ward accounted for 65% of the electors.

References

External links
Parish council
Latimer and Ley Hill parish map

Civil parishes in Buckinghamshire
Chiltern District